Katie-Rae Ebzery (born 8 January 1990) is an Australian former professional basketball player who played 15 seasons in the Women's National Basketball League (WNBL). She was a three-time All-WNBL First Team member and a two-time Olympian with the Australian Opals.

Early life
Ebzery was born in Waratah, New South Wales. From a young age, she would watch her mum and cousins play basketball. She started playing socially at the age of five, and by the age of nine she was playing representative basketball for the Newcastle Hunters. She attended St Mary's High School in Newcastle.

Professional career
Ebzery debuted in the Women's National Basketball League (WNBL) in 2005 with the Australian Institute of Sport (AIS). The talented guard left the AIS after three seasons with 65 WNBL games to her name at just 18 years of age. After playing for the Dandenong Rangers in the 2008–09 season, she stepped away from the WNBL for the 2009–10 season.

In 2010, Ebzery joined the Sydney Uni Flames. In 2014–15, she passed 200 WNBL games and was named the Flames Club MVP after averaging 16.8 points per game, the sixth highest average in the league. She played her sixth season for the Flames in 2015–16 and was named to the WNBL All-Star Five.

For the 2016–17 season, Ebzery moved to Russia to play for Dynamo Moscow.

Ebzery returned to the WNBL and the Sydney Uni Flames for the 2017–18 season.

In June 2018, Ebzery signed a two-year contract with the Perth Lynx. In the 2019–20 season, she was named to the WNBL All-Star First Team.

In June 2020, Ebzery re-signed with the Lynx. In the 2020 WNBL Hub season in Queensland, she was named to the All-WNBL First Team. She finished the regular season fourth (18.0) in scoring and ninth (3.6) in assists.

In October 2021, Ebzery retired from the WNBL after 15 seasons and 304 games.

Off-season stints
Between 2008 and 2012, Ebzery played for the Newcastle Hunters in the Waratah League. In 2014, she played for the Hornsby Spiders and helped them win the Waratah League championship with a grand final MVP performance. In 2015, she played for the BA Centre of Excellence in the SEABL. In 2016, she had a short stint with the Hunters. In 2021, she played four games for the Hunters, who were crowned champions following the season's cancellation due to the COVID-19 pandemic.

National team career
In 2007, Ebzery represented Australia at the FIBA Under-19 World Championship in Slovakia.

In 2011 and 2013, Ebzery won bronze with the Australian University Team at the World University Games. She also won bronze with the Australian 3x3 team at the inaugural FIBA 3x3 World Championships in 2012.

Ebzery made her Australian Opals debut at the 2015 FIBA Oceania Championship, where the Opals claimed gold. In 2016, she played for the Opals at the Olympic Test Event in Rio de Janeiro, and later in the Rio Olympics.

In 2017, Ebzery played for the Opals at the FIBA Women's Asia Cup, where she helped them win silver in Division A.

In 2018, Ebzery helped the Opals win gold at the Commonwealth Games and silver at the FIBA World Cup.

In 2019, Ebzery helped the Opals win bronze at the FIBA Asia Cup. She later played in the FIBA Olympic pre-qualifying tournament and the FIBA Olympic Qualifying Tournament.

At the Tokyo Olympics in July and August 2021, Ebzery averaged 6.5 points, 3.5 rebounds and 4.3 assists in four games.

Personal life
Ebzery is the daughter of Helen and Robert. She has three siblings, brothers Andrew and Mathew, and sister Alison. Alison made her debut in the WNBL in 2019.

References

External links

Katie-Rae Ebzery WNBL profile at GameDay

1990 births
Living people
Australian expatriate basketball people in Russia
Australian Institute of Sport basketball (WNBL) players
Australian women's basketball players
Basketball players at the 2016 Summer Olympics
Basketball players at the 2018 Commonwealth Games
Basketball players at the 2020 Summer Olympics
Commonwealth Games medallists in basketball
Commonwealth Games gold medallists for Australia
Dandenong Rangers
Medalists at the 2011 Summer Universiade
Medalists at the 2013 Summer Universiade
Olympic basketball players of Australia
Perth Lynx players
Shooting guards
Small forwards
Sydney Uni Flames
Universiade bronze medalists for Australia
Universiade medalists in basketball
Women's National Basketball League players
Sportspeople from Newcastle, New South Wales
Sportswomen from New South Wales
Medallists at the 2018 Commonwealth Games